The third season of Undercover premiered on BNT 1 on November 25, 2012, and ended on February 17, 2013.

Plot
Martin, Dzharo, The Hair and the Twins are jailed. Ivo is the new boss. The Hook and Adi are on a vacation where The Hook is on a community service and on a parole. Martin is later released from jail, but finds out that Ivo wants to kill him. Dzharo orders Ivo's murder. Niki the Twin dies from injuries, The Hair gets killed and Dzharo had a dream about Mironov and Elica. Ivo is hit by the biggest loss ever - Dzharo ordered his mother's murder. Neshev is shot during an operation and succumbs to his injuries.

Cast

Main
 Ivaylo Zahariev as Martin Hristov
 Zahary Baharov as Ivo Andonov
 Vladimir Penev as Inspector Emil Popov
 Mihail Bilalov as Petar Tudzharov - Dzharo
 Alexander Sano as Zdravko Kiselov - The Hair (episodes 1–11)
 Kiril Efremov as Tihomir Gardev - Tisho the Twin
 Ventsislav Yankov as Nikolay Rashev - Niki the Twin (episodes 1–6)
 Tzvetana Maneva as Cveta Andonova, Ivo's mother (episodes 1, 3–4)
 Petar Popyordanov as Momchil Neshev (episodes 1–3)
 Marian Valev as Rosen Gatzov - The Hook

Guest
 Hristo Mutafchiev as Alexander Mironov (episode 11)

Episodes

External links
 Pod Prikritie Official website
 Pod Prikritie Facebook
 New Films International: Undercover
 

Bulgarian television series
2011 Bulgarian television series debuts
2010s Bulgarian television series
2016 Bulgarian television series endings